Denis Thomas Keogh (1838 - 24 August 1911) was a member of the Queensland Legislative Assembly.

Biography
Keogh was born at Galway, Ireland, the son of Thomas Joseph Keogh and his wife Margaret (née O'Toole). He was educated at Thurles College in Tipperary and St Thomas' College in Newbridge. He arrived at Melbourne in 1854, working as a clerk and an auctioneer before moving to Queensland in 1859. Here he managed Alderton and Juandah stations. From 1862 until his death he was a storekeeper in Ipswich.

He married Agnes McPhail in 1858 (died 1899) and together had one daughter. Keogh died on a goods train bound for Ipswich in August 1911 and his funeral proceeded from his Brisbane Street residence to the Ipswich General Cemetery.

Public life
Keogh, at first representing Labour, won the seat of Rosewood at the 1896 Queensland Colonial election, but the election was declared void and a by-election was called. He won again and held the seat until 1902 when he was defeated by Robert Hodge. Hodge however was unseated by petition in December 1904 and Keogh was appointed to represent Rosewood once again. He went on to hold the seat until his death in 1911.

References

Members of the Queensland Legislative Assembly
1838 births
1911 deaths
Alumni of St. Patrick's College, Thurles
People educated at Newbridge College
Burials at Ipswich General Cemetery
Australian Labor Party members of the Parliament of Queensland